The 2008–09 Indiana Hoosiers men's basketball team represented Indiana University. The head coach was Tom Crean. The team played its home games in the Assembly Hall in Bloomington, Indiana, and was a member of the Big Ten Conference.

The Big Ten Network included the team in a two-and-a-half-hour special that featured Midnight Madness events from several Big Ten campuses on October 17, 2008; the Indiana event to kick off the season was called "Hoosier Hysteria". The Hoosiers defeated the Northwestern St. Demons on November 14 in Head Coach Tom Crean's opening game.

In November 2008, the NCAA imposed a three-year probation on the Indiana men's basketball program and upheld the school's self-imposed sanctions stemming from the actions of former head coach Kelvin Sampson and his staff. School athletic director Rick Greenspan resigned. There was no ban for the program in television, scholarships or post-season play.

Roster
Coaches: Tom Crean, Tim Buckley, Bennie Seltzer, Roshown McLeod

Recruiting class

Schedule and Results

|-
!colspan=9 style=| Regular season

 

   
 
 
 
 
 
 
 
 

|-
!colspan=9 style=| Big Ten tournament

The 2008–09 season was the worst in the history of Indiana Basketball and finished with the fewest wins (6) since 1915–16.  Their 1–17 conference record was the worst since the conference went to an 18-game schedule.

See also
Indiana Hoosiers men's basketball
2008-09 Big Ten Conference men's basketball season
2009 Big Ten Conference men's basketball tournament
2009 NCAA Division I men's basketball tournament

References

Indiana
Indiana Hoosiers men's basketball seasons
2008 in sports in Indiana
2009 in sports in Indiana